Francis Raymond de Sauvetât, or Raymond of Toledo, was the Archbishop of Toledo from 1125 to 1152. He was a French Benedictine monk, born in Gascony. 

His most important work was the creation of a working group of translators that would later be known as the Toledo School of Translators. He ordered the reconstruction of the Cathedral of Toledo, reserving a section of the building for the School. The group recovered lost classical ancient texts of antiquity and promoted the delivery of major advances in the Toledo School of Medicine, algebra and astronomy.

He attended the Council of Rheims in 1148.

Notes

Bibliography

González Palencia, Ángel. El arzobispo Don Raimundo de Toledo y la escuela de traductores, Barcelona: Labor, 1942.

External links

Archbishops of Toledo
French Benedictines
12th-century Roman Catholic archbishops in León and Castile
12th-century French Roman Catholic priests
Year of death missing
Year of birth unknown
Spanish translators